is a passenger railway station located in Aoba-ku, Yokohama, Kanagawa Prefecture, Japan, operated by the private railway company Tokyu Corporation.

Lines

Station layout 
The station consists of two opposed elevated side platforms serving two tracks, with the station building located underneath.

Platforms

History
Fujigaoka Station was opened on April 1, 1966. The station building was rebuilt in 1999.

Passenger statistics
In fiscal 2019, the station was used by an average of 26,769 passengers daily. 

The passenger figures for previous years are as shown below.

Surrounding area
Fujigaoka Shopping Center
 Fujigaoka Park
 Moegino Park 
 Fujigaoka District Center
Yokohama City Moegino Elementary School
Yokohama City Moegino Junior High School

See also
 List of railway stations in Japan

References

External links

 

Railway stations in Kanagawa Prefecture
Railway stations in Japan opened in 1966
Railway stations in Yokohama